Marie-Isabelle "Marisabel" Lomba (born 17 August 1974) is a Belgian judoka and Olympic medalist. She competed at the 1996 Summer Olympics in Atlanta, winning a bronze medal in the lightweight class. She also competed at the 2000 Summer Olympics.

Career
Born in Charleroi, Lomba was a 7 time Belgian judo champion (1993, 1994, 1995, 1997, 2001, 2002). She competed mainly in the categories -56 kg, -57 kg and -60 kg. 
In 1997 she won the gold medal in the European Championship in the category -56 kg. In 1999 and 2001 she won the gold medal at the European Championship for teams, in 1997 silver and in 1994 and 2000 she won the bronze medal in the European Championship for teams. The high point of her career was winning the Bronze Medal in the -56 kg category at the 1996 Summer Olympics in Atlanta.

References

External links
 

1974 births
Living people
Belgian female judoka
Olympic judoka of Belgium
Olympic bronze medalists for Belgium
Judoka at the 1996 Summer Olympics
Judoka at the 2000 Summer Olympics
Olympic medalists in judo
Sportspeople from Charleroi
Medalists at the 1996 Summer Olympics
20th-century Belgian women